Ornithotarsus is a genus of hadrosaurid ornithopod dinosaurs that lived in North America during the Late Cretaceous Period in what is now the Merchantville Formation about 84 million to 78 million years ago.

Taxonomy
Ornithotarsus immanis was described in 1869 on the basis of YPM 3221, a fragmentary hindlimb comprising a distal tibia and fibula as well as ankle bones unearthed from the Merchantville Formation of Raritan Bay of New Jersey. Although subsequently treated as a synonym of Hadrosaurus, Prieto-Marquez et al. (2006) found Ornithotarsus to share no diagnostic traits with the H. foulkii holotype and declared it a moment dubium undetermined beyond Hadrosauridae, and Brownstein (2021) agreed with this assessment.

References

Late Cretaceous dinosaurs of North America
Hadrosaurs
Fossil taxa described in 1869
Paleontology in New Jersey
Ornithischian genera
Taxa named by Edward Drinker Cope